Proboloptila is a genus of moths belonging to the family Tineidae.

Species
Proboloptila aeolella (Walsingham, 1897)
Proboloptila frontella (Walsingham, 1897)

References

Tineidae
Tineidae genera
Taxa named by Edward Meyrick